Rayfield Dupree (born April 2, 1953) is an American former athlete. He competed in the men's triple jump at the 1976 Summer Olympics.

References

External links
 

1953 births
Living people
Athletes (track and field) at the 1976 Summer Olympics
American male triple jumpers
Olympic track and field athletes of the United States
Track and field athletes from Los Angeles
20th-century American people
21st-century American people